Face to Face: A Live Recording is a live album by Steve Harley & Cockney Rebel, which was released by EMI in 1977. It was produced by Steve Harley and Tony Clark.

Background
Following the release of their sixth studio album Love's a Prima Donna, Steve Harley & Cockney Rebel embarked on an eight-date UK tour in December 1976. For the tour, Jo Partridge replaced guitarist Jim Cregan, who had left the band after the recording of Love's a Prima Donna to join Rod Stewart's touring band. Speaking to Melody Maker in 1977, Harley said of the tour, "We did eight concerts and every night was great. I'm not just saying that. Jimmy had left to join Rod Stewart's band and Jo Partridge brought new energy. It was our fourth major tour and the fans were on my side from the word go. They're a great audience. It was the best concert tour I've done in my life. I've never enjoyed playing so much in my career."

Prior to the tour, Harley decided to have some of the concerts recorded for a potential live album release. The concerts at London's Hammersmith Odeon, Birmingham Odeon, Glasgow Apollo and Newcastle City Hall were recorded using the mobile recording studios RAK Mobile and La Maison Rouge. On 12 February 1977, the band played a one-off charity concert at the London Rainbow in aid of the homeless in Northern Ireland, and this show was also recorded. A few days ahead of the Rainbow show, Harley told Melody Maker that he was in the process of listening to the tracks recorded on the December tour. Over the following weeks, Harley worked on mixing the recordings and selecting the best tracks, with Tony Clark serving as the engineer and co-producer. The tracks were mixed at both Abbey Road Studios and Air Studios in London, and were later mastered by Ken Perry at Capitol Studios in Los Angeles.

Speaking of the upcoming album to Record Mirror, Harley said, 

Comparing the live recordings with the original studio versions of the songs performed, Harley added, "They knock spots off them. In most cases they're 10 times better." However, Harley did admit he hadn't enjoyed the process of mixing the tracks, "To me, it's a very uncreative operation. It's only, after all, engineering and engineering is an evil, and not particularly exciting, necessity." He added to Record Mirror in July 1977, "The big thing for me was to get the audiences right. I wanted it to sound like one concert, when in fact, it's culled from different halls. The audience clapping on the opening cut is 3,500 people recorded in Birmingham, while the next cut is 2,200 in Newcastle. I didn't want any of that stuff where it sounds different from cut to cut or you fade out the applause. I wanted this to sound like one show and as live as it could be."

Once the mixing of the live recordings was completed, Harley disbanded Cockney Rebel, with the news being announced in the press on 5 July 1977. Harley told the Daily Mirror, "They understand that Steve Harley & Cockney Rebel have come to the end of an era – that is partly why I made the live album – and that I have to go on and do other things." Harley signed to EMI for a further three years and began recording his debut solo album Hobo with a Grin.

Release
Face to Face: A Live Recording was released by EMI Records as a double-LP on 9 July 1977. The album reached number 40 in the UK Albums Chart and remained in the top 50 for four weeks. To promote the album, a live single was released in August, featuring "The Best Years of Our Lives" as the A-side and "Tumbling Down" as the B-side.

The album received its first CD release by EMI in 1997, but in the Netherlands only. In 2000, BGO Records released a remastered version of the album on CD in the UK and Europe.

Critical reception

On its release, Geoff Barton of Sounds wrote, "I count several Rebel concerts to be amongst the most emotional and enjoyable I've ever seen. Side one gets off to a slow start, non-atmospheric and yawn-prompting, Cockney Rebel sounding curiously leaden. Side two suffers from the same kind of problems. By contrast, side three and four are magnificent, compulsive. The involvement builds and builds until, towards the end, everyone sings along in fine football chorus tradition. Highly charged, sincere, spine-tingling stuff. The latter half of Face To Face is quite magical, strikes a deep emotional chord. And I can't think of many albums that do that, can you?" Sheila Prophet of Record Mirror said, "Whatever you might think of Harley and his ego, there's no doubt that onstage, it makes him into a magnificent, riveting performer. Every time I've seen him live, the effect was the same – total involvement. But does this involvement come over on record? Well, side one starts off pretty unpromisingly. It picks up a bit, but it's still fairly routine stuff. Where is Harley the Presence? Well, he's there on side two, but in his least acceptable form. Without his dramatic stage appearance, his vocals sound ridiculously overwrought. Oh dear. But wait – between side two and three, something magic has happened. Harley has taken over and suddenly, his whole ego trip seems almost justified. He's the central figure, with the audience as his backing band."

Peter Trollope of the Liverpool Echo wrote, "The first two sides are deadweight, definitely music to do something else to. However, Sides Three and Four sort of grab you by the throat." In the US, Billboard noted that the album "ranges from slow and midtempo R&B ballads to fast-paced rockers highlighted by Harley's soulful vocals". Steve Pond of the Los Angeles Times commented, "Face to Face is too uneven to make many new fans. Harley is at his best on material like 'Make Me Smile', where his vocal mannerisms and dramatic phrasing add punch and character. But on most of the album the vocals are strained rather than commanding, and the arrangements often lack the sparkle of the originals." The Chicago Daily News stated, "Harley and his group Cockney Rebel supposedly are very big in their native England, but you'd never know it from this tired live set. Not offensive nor ugly; also not passionate or feeling. Mere going through the motions."

Retrospective reviews

Dave Thompson of AllMusic retrospectively stated, "By 1977, [Harley] scarcely seemed to even remember the songs, so the audience sung half of them for him. Here his voice simply sounds affected... either that, or the poor lad has hiccups. And they don't go away. No complaints about the actual set list. Across four sides of vinyl, Harley has always been well aware of his own worth and delivers a show which is half greatest hits, half greatest bits. But the pale apologies for the epics, the perfunctory trawls through the classics, and the 'gee-it's-so-wonderful-to-be-here' simper which now passes for stage presence aren't simply inexcusable. They are embarrassing and, no matter how lustily the audience sings along with their favorites, you know that they won't be calling him 'Sebastian' ever again. 'Judy Teen' has left the building."

Track listing

Personnel
Steve Harley & Cockney Rebel
Steve Harley – vocals
Jo Partridge – lead guitar
Duncan Mackay – keyboards
George Ford – bass guitar
Stuart Elliott – drums

Additional musicians
Lindsey Elliott – percussion
Tony Rivers, John G. Perry, Stuart Calver – backing vocals

Production
Steve Harley – producer
Tony Clark – engineer, co-producer
David Jacobson – live sound
Ken Perry – mastering

Sleeve
Hipgnosis – original sleeve design
Garrod & Lofthouse – printing

Charts

References

Steve Harley & Cockney Rebel albums
Albums with cover art by Hipgnosis
1977 live albums
EMI Records live albums